3787 Aivazovskij is a stony asteroid of the Itha family, located in the outer region of the asteroid belt. It was discovered by Soviet–Russian astronomer Nikolai Chernykh at the Crimean Astrophysical Observatory in Nauchnyj, on the Crimean peninsula, on 11 September 1977. It was named after painter Ivan Aivazovsky (1817–1900).

Orbit and classification 

When applying the hierarchical clustering method to its proper orbital elements, Aivazovskij is a member of the Itha family, a very small family of asteroids, named after its parent body 918 Itha. It orbits the Sun in the outer main belt at a distance of 2.5–3.2 AU once every 4 years and 10 months (1,759 days; semi-major axis of 2.85 AU). Its orbit has an eccentricity of 0.13 and an inclination of 12° with respect to the ecliptic. The first precovery was taken at Lowell Observatory in 1931, extending the asteroid's observation arc by 46 years prior to its discovery.

Naming 

This minor planet was named after Russian painter of seascapes, Ivan Aivazovsky (1817–1900), who lived and worked in the Crimean city of Feodosia. The minor planet 1048 Feodosia is named after this place. The official naming citation was published by the Minor Planet Center on 1 September 1993.

Physical characteristics 

The asteroid has been characterized as a stony S-type asteroid by PanSTARRS photometric survey. This concurs with the overall spectral type for the Itha family.

Rotation period 

A rotational lightcurve of Aivazovskij was obtained from photometric observations made in March 2008, at the Universidad de Monterry Observatory, Mexico. It showed a well-defined rotation period of  hours with a brightness amplitude of 0.18 in magnitude.

Diameter and albedo 

Based on the survey carried out by the NEOWISE mission of NASA's space-based Wide-field Infrared Survey Explorer, the asteroid measure 12.1 kilometers in diameter and its surface has a high albedo of 0.33, while the Collaborative Asteroid Lightcurve Link assumes a standard albedo for stony asteroids of 0.20, and calculates a diameter 14.9 kilometers with an absolute magnitude of 11.5.

References

External links 
 Lightcurve Database Query (LCDB), at www.minorplanet.info
 Dictionary of Minor Planet Names, Google books
 Asteroids and comets rotation curves, CdR – Geneva Observatory, Raoul Behrend
 Discovery Circumstances: Numbered Minor Planets (1)-(5000)  – Minor Planet Center
 
 

003787
Discoveries by Nikolai Chernykh
Named minor planets
19770911